Probank was a Greek bank. Its headquarters were in Athens and it operated 112 branches (as of November 2012) across Greece.

It was established in July 2001, following the receipt of a banking license by the Bank of Greece in May 2001. The first branch was opened in November 2001. The management of PROBANK has had a successful history in terms of profitably and effectively operating in one of the most challenging market segments in commercial retail banking—namely small and medium size enterprises—since the mid-1970s in Greece.

See also
List of banks in Greece

References

Defunct banks of Greece
Banks established in 2001
Greek companies established in 2001